Greatest Hits 1992–2010: E da qui is the second greatest hits album by Italian singer-songwriter Nek. It was released in 2010.

Overview
The compilation is composed of two discs, including the singles released in Nek's 20-year-long career, along with three live songs and three new tracks, released as singles to promote the album: "E da qui", "Vulnerabile" and the ballad "È con te", dedicated to Nek's daughter Beatrice.

A version of the album named "Greatest Hits 1992–2010: Es así" was released for the Spanish market. It contains the Spanish language versions of the songs. The newly recorded songs are named "Es así", "Vulnerable" and "Para tí".

The album was certified platinum by the Federation of the Italian Music Industry for sales exceeding 60,000 copies in Italy.

Track listing

Italian version

CD 1

CD 2

Spanish version

CD 1

CD 2

Charts

Album

References

2010 greatest hits albums
Nek albums